Kalhatti Falls also called as Bird Watcher's Falls is a tourist spot near Ooty, The Nilgiris, Tamil Nadu. These falls are about 13 km from Ooty, on the Ooty to Mysore Road or Sigur Ghat Road, It is situated at an average height of around 400 feet in the Sigur Plateau.This Place is rich in wild life like Bison, Bear, Deer, and also various type of birds. From the Kalhatti village one has to continue for 2 miles to reach the falls and the falls is connected in the same Kalhatti village road.

See also
 Nilgiri mountains
 Catherine Falls
 Law's Falls
 Katary Falls
 Upper Bhavani
 Pykara
 Ooty Lake
 Kamaraj Sagar Dam

External links

References

Tourist attractions in Nilgiris district